Arnold is a former census-designated place (CDP), which was located in Rice Lake, Saint Louis County, Minnesota, United States.  The population was 2,960 at the 2010 census. The census-designated place of Arnold was located entirely within the former Rice Lake Township, adjacent to the north side of the city of Duluth.  Rice Lake Township was incorporated as the city of Rice Lake on October 22, 2015, thus rendering the census-designated place of Arnold to no longer exist.

The name "Arnold", as a place of residence, had been seldom used in the present day by the younger generations.  Since about 1970, those who reside in this area had identified themselves as residents of Rice Lake or Duluth.  The CDP name "Arnold" was used only for statistical purposes for the U.S. decennial census count of population.

Geography

Demographics

As of the census of 2000, there were 3,032 people, 1,108 households, and 850 families residing in the CDP. The racial makeup of the CDP was 97.86% White, 0.36% Black or African American, 0.56% Native American, 0.23% Asian, 0.07% Pacific Islander, 0.03% from other races, and 0.89% from two or more races. Hispanic or Latino of any race were 0.33% of the population. 20.4% were of Norwegian, 19.3% German, 12.5% Swedish, 7.9% Polish, 6.7% Finnish and 5.4% English ancestry according to Census 2000.

There were 1,108 households, out of which 36.7% had children under the age of 18 living with them, 66.2% were married couples living together, 6.8% had a female householder with no husband present, and 23.2% were non-families. 18.7% of all households were made up of individuals, and 6.1% had someone living alone who was 65 years of age or older.  The average household size was 2.73 and the average family size was 3.11.

In the CDP the population was spread out, with 27.4% under the age of 18, 6.9% from 18 to 24, 31.1% from 25 to 44, 23.8% from 45 to 64, and 10.8% who were 65 years of age or older.  The median age was 38 years. For every 100 females, there were 101.5 males.  For every 100 females age 18 and over, there were 104.7 males.

The median income for a household in the CDP was $46,111, and the median income for a family was $53,194. Males had a median income of $40,281 versus $28,397 for females. The per capita income for the CDP was $18,104.  About 5.5% of families and 5.2% of the population were below the poverty line, including 3.6% of those under age 18 and 6.5% of those age 65 or over.

See also
 City of Rice Lake

References

Geography of St. Louis County, Minnesota
Former Census-designated places in Minnesota